Tony Lawrence may refer to:
 Tony Lawrence (soccer)
 Tony Lawrence (singer)

See also
 Anthony Lawrence (disambiguation)